Michael Croel (born June 6, 1969) is a former American football linebacker who played in the National Football League (NFL) and XFL.

Career
In a seven-year NFL career, he played for the Denver Broncos, New York Giants, Baltimore Ravens and Seattle Seahawks of the NFL and the Los Angeles Xtreme of the XFL. Croel attended Los Altos High School (Los Altos, California) and  Lincoln-Sudbury Regional High School, he played college football at the University of Nebraska. In 2003, he was inducted in their Football Hall of fame.

Croel was selected by the Broncos in the first round of the 1991 NFL Draft. In 1991, he was chosen as the NFL Defensive Rookie of the Year and the UPI AFL-AFC Rookie of the Year award. In that same rookie year, Croel recorded ten sacks, his single-season high. In 101 career games, Croel scored one touchdown, recorded 24 sacks, two interceptions and 38 yards.

References

1969 births
Living people
American football linebackers
Nebraska Cornhuskers football players
National Football League Defensive Rookie of the Year Award winners
Denver Broncos players
New York Giants players
Baltimore Ravens players
Seattle Seahawks players
All-American college football players
Lincoln-Sudbury Regional High School alumni